Vipera ammodytes gregorwallneri is a venomous viper subspecies endemic to Austria and the former Yugoslavia.

It has no common English name.

Geographic range
It is found in Austria and the former Yugoslavia.

Taxonomy
Many authors, such as Golay et al. (1993) do not recognize this taxon and instead relegate it to the synonymy of V. a. ammodytes.

References

Further reading
Golay P, Smith HM, Broadley DG, Dixon JR, McCarthy CJ, Rage J-C, Schätti B, Toriba M. 1993. Endoglyphs and Other Major Venomous Snakes of the World. A Checklist. Geneva: Azemiops. 478 pp.
Sochurek E. 1974. Vipera ammodytes gregorwallneri n. ssp. Herpet. Blätter, Wien [Vienna] (1).

ammodytes gregorwallneri
Reptiles described in 1974